Nikolay Petrovich Anikin (also transliterated as Nikolai or Nikolaj; 25 January 1932 – 14 November 2009) was a Soviet cross-country skier who competed during the late 1950s and early 1960s, training at Dynamo in Moscow. He was born in Ishim, Tyumen Oblast, Russia, USSR.

Medals
He earned three medals at the Winter Olympics with two medals in the 4x10 km relay (gold: 1956, bronze: 1960) and a bronze in the 30 km (1960). He also earned a silver medal in the 4x10 km relay at the 1958 FIS Nordic World Ski Championships.

Awards
He was awarded Order of the Badge of Honor (1957).

Coaching career
In 1963 Anikin started coaching for the Soviet national junior and senior teams with whom he spent 27 years ultimately becoming head coach. He moved to Salt Lake City, UT in 1990 to coach the U.S. National Team, then to Marquette, MI to work at an Olympic training program. He settled in Duluth MN in 1994 where he coached elite, masters and junior skiers for the remainder of his career.

Death
Anikin died from cancer at his home in Duluth, Minnesota, aged 77.

References

External links
 

1932 births
2009 deaths
People from Ishim, Tyumen Oblast
Olympic cross-country skiers of the Soviet Union
Olympic gold medalists for the Soviet Union
Olympic bronze medalists for the Soviet Union
Soviet male cross-country skiers
Dynamo sports society athletes
Cross-country skiers at the 1956 Winter Olympics
Cross-country skiers at the 1960 Winter Olympics
Olympic medalists in cross-country skiing
FIS Nordic World Ski Championships medalists in cross-country skiing
Medalists at the 1956 Winter Olympics
Medalists at the 1960 Winter Olympics
Deaths from cancer in Minnesota
Honoured Masters of Sport of the USSR
Merited Coaches of the Soviet Union
Russian State University of Physical Education, Sport, Youth and Tourism alumni
Sportspeople from Tyumen Oblast